University College Cork Association Football Club  is an Irish association football club based in Cork. It was founded in 1952 by students at University College Cork. Its senior men's team currently play in the Munster Senior League Senior Premier Division. They also regularly compete in the Collingwood, Crowley and Harding Cups, the FAI Intermediate Cup, and FAI Junior Cup. They have also played in the FAI Cup. UCC A.F.C. currently fields teams in the Munster Senior League, the Cork Athletic Union League, and the FAI College & Universities Football League

History

Intervarsity
UCC A.F.C. is affiliated to the Irish Universities Football Union and competes in three annual intervarsity competitions – the Collingwood Cup, the Crowley Cup and the Harding Cup. UCC A.F.C. first won the Collingwood Cup in 1974. However subsequently they only enjoyed sporadic successes. Then during 1990s they won it twice in a row – 1990 and 1991. However, in more recent times they have been far more successful. They won it again in 2000 and then between 2002 and 2005 retained it four times in a row. In 2011, with a team featuring Josh O’Shea and Michael McSweeney and managed by John Caulfield, UCC won the Collingwood Cup again. O’Shea, McSweeney and Caulfield all subsequently joined Cork City F.C.. In 2015 UCC A.F.C. enjoyed one of its most successful intervarsity seasons. In addition to winning the senior Collingwood Cup, they also won the Crowley Cup, the reserve team competition, and the Harding Cup, featuring teams made up of freshers or first year students. UCC A.F.C. actually entered two teams in both the Crowley Cup and the Harding Cup. In February 2015 UCC A.F.C. hosted the Harding Cup. The UCC freshers team defeated teams representing Dublin City University, NUI Galway and University of Limerick over three consecutive days to claim the cup. In the final played at The Mardyke on 8 February, UCC defeated Limerick 1–0. Later in the same month the UCC senior team won the Collingwood Cup. In the quarter finals they defeated defending champions Maynooth University, managed by Ger O’Brien, 7–6 on penalties. In the semi-final they defeated NUI Galway 1–0. The final, which was played at Eamon Deacy Park on 26 February, saw UCC defeat Dublin University 3–1. In March UCC completed an Intervarsity treble when they also won the Crowley Cup. In 2015 they completed an Intervarsity treble – winning the Collingwood Cup, the Crowley Cup and the Harding Cup.

MSL and EA Sports Cup
In addition to Intervarsity success, UCC A.F.C. has also enjoyed recent successes in the Munster Senior League. In 2011–12 they won the Senior First Division and as a result were promoted to the Senior Premier Division. In 2013–14,2016–17 and 2018–19 they were the Senior Premier Division champions. As a result, they qualified to compete in the 2015 League of Ireland Cup. After knocking out League of Ireland First Division teams Wexford Youths and Cobh Ramblers in early rounds they reached the quarter-finals where they played the holders, Dundalk, at The Mardyke. Dundalk were also the 2014 and 2015 League of Ireland champions and proved too strong for UCC.

Following the club's MSL Premier Division win in 2017, they qualified for the 2018 League of Ireland Cup, losing 4–1 to Premier Division side Waterford FC in the first round at the RSC.

Home Grounds
UCC A.F.C. play their home games at two grounds. Their traditional home has been The Mardyke. However they also played at the UCC Sports Grounds at Curraheen Road, Bishopstown. This ground is commonly referred to as The Farm.

Quarry Cup
The club hosts an annual tournament known as the Quarry Cup as a means to raise funds. It is a knockout competition featuring nine-a-side teams made up of University College Cork students playing forty minute games.

Honours
Munster Senior League Senior Premier Division
Winners:2016–17, 2018–19 : 2 
Runners-up: 1977–78, 1978–79, 2012–13: 3
Munster Senior League Senior First Division
Winners: 2011–12 
Collingwood Cup
Winners: 1974, 1978, 1986, 1990, 1991, 2000, 2002, 2003, 2004, 2005, 2011, 2015, 2017, 2019 : 14  
Crowley Cup
Winners: 1996, 2000, 2009, 2015 : 4
Harding Cup
Winners: 1995, 1993, 1989, 1982, 1981, 1972, 1995, 2015: 8
Corinthian Cup
Winners: 2009–10
City Challenge Cup
Winners: 2018–19

Notable former players
  Ger Canning – RTÉ sports commentator 
  John Meyler – Cork GAA hurler
  Sean McLoughlin – Hull City FC footballer
  Josh O'Shea – Cork City FC footballer
  Michael McSweeney – Cork City FC footballer
  Rob Lehane – Cork City FC footballer

Notable former managers
  John Caulfield

Related teams
 College Corinthians A.F.C. was founded in 1971 by former players no longer eligible to play for UCC A.F.C. after they graduated. They play in the Munster Senior League.
 UCC Diaspora F.C. is based in the London Borough of Wandsworth and was also founded by former UCC A.F.C. players. It fields three teams in the Wimbledon & District Football League.
 UCC United FC is a team founded by staff and employees of University College Cork as opposed to students. They play in the Cork Business & Shipping League. In 2012–13 they were winners of the CBSL First Division and in 2014–15 they won the CBSL Premier Cup. In the 2017 – 18 season, they were crowned Champions of the CBSL Premier Division.

References

Munster Senior League (association football) clubs
Association football clubs in County Cork
Association
Cork
1952 establishments in Ireland
Association football clubs established in 1952
Association football clubs in Cork (city)
Cork Athletic Union League clubs